Chemung Canal Trust Company is a New York State chartered trust company based in Elmira, New York. It was founded as a publicly traded bank in 1833. In 1857, the Arnot family gained control of the bank and operated a private family bank until 1903, when the bank again became publicly owned. Originally housed in the Chemung Canal Bank Building, the bank moved to 129 East Water Street in 1920, and then to its current home at One Chemung Canal Plaza in 1971.

In 1951, the bank began expanding and currently has branches throughout the Twin Tiers. In 2011, the bank acquired the Fort Orange Financial Corp. and its subsidiary Capital Bank & Trust Company of Albany, New York, expanding its network to the Albany area.

References

External links
Chemung Canal Trust Company official website

Financial services companies based in New York (state)